Guadalupe is a district of the Goicoechea canton, in the San José province of Costa Rica. It is the head city of the Goicoechea Canton, and now fully incorporated in the Metropolitan Area of San Jose.

History
Guadalupe acquired the title of city on 10 August 1920

Geography 
Guadalupe has an area of  km² and an elevation of  metres.

Demographics 

For the 2011 census, Guadalupe had a population of  inhabitants.

Transportation

Road transportation 
The district is covered by the following road routes:
 National Route 39
 National Route 108
 National Route 200
 National Route 201
 National Route 205
 National Route 218

Notable people 
 Ulises Segura - Soccer player for D.C. United

References 

Districts of San José Province
Populated places in San José Province